Christopher Robert Gilbert (born 16 April 1984) is an English first-class cricketer, who represented England at various age levels. A talented all-round sportsman, he has also played hockey for England under 18s. He played cricket for Yorkshire County Cricket Club at first-class level in 2007. An all rounder, he bowls right arm medium pace and is a right-handed batsman.

Gilbert was born in Scarborough, North Yorkshire, England, and attended Scarborough College. He made his Yorkshire one day debut against Leicestershire on 16 June 2006. Yorkshire lost the game, but Gilbert claimed 3 wickets for 33. He also played Twenty/20 cricket for Yorkshire in 2006, and made his first-class debut against Loughborough UCCE in May 2007. He scored 64 runs in his only innings, and took 0 for 11 with his bowling, plus one catch. He was released by Yorkshire at the end of that season.

In 2008, he signed for Scarborough, in Perth, Australia. In the 2014/15 season, he joined Swan Athletic Caversham Cricket Club, who play in the top flight of the WASTCA competition. Gilbert was appointed the captaincy of the cricket club in the 2015/16 season.

References

External links

1984 births
Living people
Yorkshire cricketers
Cricketers from Scarborough, North Yorkshire
English cricketers
English cricketers of the 21st century
Yorkshire Cricket Board cricketers
People educated at Scarborough College